Sparganothina irregularis is a species of moth of the family Tortricidae. It is found in Sinaloa, Mexico.

The length of the forewings is about 7.5 mm. The forewings are golden yellow with mixed dark brown and orange-brown markings. The hindwings are pale greyish brown with a faint darker line.

References

Moths described in 2001
Sparganothini